"She Gets Down on Her Knees" is a song by Yoko Ono. It was originally recorded for 1974's A Story (which wasn't released until 1997), and later re-recorded for 1981's Season of Glass. An acoustic demo version of the song was included on a reissue of Approximately Infinite Universe. The original version was later released as part of 1992's Onobox box set and Walking on Thin Ice greatest-hits.

Track listing
Remixes Part 1
 "She Gets Down On Her Knees" (Ralphi club mix) – 8:11
 "She Gets Down On Her Knees" (Ralphi dub mix) – 8:11
 "She Gets Down On Her Knees" (Ralphi radio edit) – 3:55
 "She Gets Down On Her Knees" (Rich Morel Vox mix) – 8:05
 "She Gets Down On Her Knees" (Rich Morel dub mix) – 6:39
 "She Gets Down On Her Knees" (Yiannis Alluring French Kiss mix) – 9:38
 "She Gets Down On Her Knees" (Yiannis Alluring French Kiss edit) – 7:33
 "She Gets Down On Her Knees" (Yiannis Alluring French Kiss radio mix) – 4:31

Remixes Part 2
 "She Gets Down On Her Knees" (Jochen Simms club mix) – 6:32
 "She Gets Down On Her Knees" (Jochen Simms dub mix) – 6:35
 "She Gets Down On Her Knees" (Craven Moore's Head mix) – 7:42
 "She Gets Down On Her Knees" (Craven Moore's Heart-Beat mix) – 5:09
 "She Gets Down On Her Knees" (Dave Aude club mix) – 6:58
 "She Gets Down On Her Knees" (Dave Aude dub mix) – 6:57
 "She Gets Down On Her Knees" (Penguin Prison remix) – 6:02
 "She Gets Down On Her Knees" (Penguin Prison dub) – 6:02
 "She Gets Down On Her Knees" (Mike Cruz club mix) – 8:11
 "She Gets Down On Her Knees" (Mike Cruz instrumental) – 8:11

Charts

Weekly charts

References

2012 singles
Yoko Ono songs
1974 songs
Songs written by Yoko Ono
Song recordings produced by Yoko Ono
Song recordings produced by Phil Spector
Song recordings produced by David Spinozza